Ernest Bryan (6 June 1926 - March 2008) was a Welsh footballer.

Bryan made one peacetime appearance in The Football League for Chester, when he replaced regular right back Reg Butcher in a 3–3 draw at Darlington in January 1949. A product of the club's youth policy, he had earlier featured in wartime league matches for the club.

After leaving Chester, Bryan moved to Colwyn Bay.

Bibliography

References

1926 births
2008 deaths
People from Hawarden
Sportspeople from Flintshire
English Football League players
Association football fullbacks
Welsh footballers
Chester City F.C. players
Colwyn Bay F.C. players